The Ballivián Cabinet constituted the 34th cabinet of the Republic of Bolivia. It was formed on 9 May 1873 after Adolfo Ballivián was sworn in as the 18th president of Bolivia following the  1873 general election, succeeding the First Frías Cabinet. It was dissolved on 14 February 1874 upon Ballivián's death and was succeeded by the Cabinet of Tomás Frías II.

Composition

History

Cabinets

References

Notes

Footnotes

Bibliography 

 

1873 establishments in Bolivia
1874 disestablishments in Bolivia
Cabinets of Bolivia
Cabinets established in 1873
Cabinets disestablished in 1874